Church of St Thomas of Canterbury (also Clapham Parish Church, or Thomas à Becket) is a parish church and Grade I listed building in Clapham, Bedfordshire, England. It became a listed building on 13 July 1964. Though the church can be traced back before A.D. 1000, there is no record of the original patron saint, Thomas Becket having been so well accepted. The church is built in the Anglo-Saxon style, possibly early 10th century.  There are narrow semi-circular-headed windows. The upper story is Early Norman. The parapet is 17th century. The remainder of the church was entirely rebuilt in 1861, by Sir George Gilbert Scott. It features a chancel, nave, and two aisles. The tower, which dates to the 11th or 12th century, measures  in height.

See also
Grade I listed buildings in Bedfordshire

References
 This article includes text incorporated from F. Arnold-Forster's "Studies in church dedications: or, England's patron saints" (1899), a publication now in the public domain.
 This article includes text incorporated from British Archaeological Association's "The Archaeological journal" (1881), a publication now in the public domain.

External links
 Official website

Church of England church buildings in Bedfordshire
Grade I listed churches in Bedfordshire
Churches completed in 1861
10th-century church buildings in England
1861 establishments in England
Churches with elements of Anglo-Saxon work
Thomas